The following is an episode list for the 1966 Batman television series starring Adam West and Burt Ward.

Series overview

Episodes

Season 1 (1966)
Season 1 aired two episodes per week, on Wednesdays and Thursdays, and followed a single storyline per week.

Film (1966)
A couple of months after the first season finished airing, a cinematic feature film of Batman premiered in theaters on July 30, 1966, featuring four of the most prominent villains, and new Bat Gadgets that were enabled by the bigger budget of the film. Julie Newmar, who had played The Catwoman in Season 1, was unavailable to act in the film due to a back injury, and was replaced in the role by Lee Meriwether.

Season 2 (1966–67)
As with the first season, Season 2 aired two episodes per week, on Wednesdays and Thursdays. The two episodes in a given week were a single storyline in 26 of the 30 weeks that made up season 2. The four weeks that were the exception to this were during weeks 19–22 of the season, with three storylines that each crossed over into the following week; a three-parter, followed by a two-parter, followed by another three-parter.

Despite being the most prominent villain during the first season, Frank Gorshin was completely absent as The Riddler during season 2, as Gorshin was holding out for a salary increase for continuing on in the role, which the studio refused to comply with. As a result, a storyline in season 2 that was originally intended for the Riddler was instead given to a character called The Puzzler, while another storyline later on in season 2 saw John Astin replace Gorshin in the role of the Riddler. 

After her absence in the 1966 film, Julie Newmar returned to the role of The Catwoman in season 2, becoming the most prominent villain during the season. Although Barbara Gordon / Batgirl would not be depicted until Season 3, Barbara is discussed in the late season 2 episodes "Batman's Waterloo" and "The Duo Defy", foreshadowing her debut months later.

Mr. Freeze was portrayed by George Sanders in season 1, but Sanders was unavailable to reprise the role. As a result, Otto Preminger was cast to portray Mr. Freeze in season 2, where Mr. Freeze was going to appear in 4 episodes. Due to tensions and difficulties on set in Preminger's two-part storyline, Eli Wallach replaced Preminger in the role of Mr. Freeze for the final two-part storyline of season 2.

Episode 39 sees the first use of the "Batdrone", used to fly over Gotham City looking for an unauthorized TV broadcast location. This was at a time, during the Vietnam War, when such unmanned drone technology only existed in highly classified form.

Season 3 (1967–68)
In Season 3, the format of the storylines were somewhat at variance with previous seasons. Season 3 aired just one episode per week, on Thursdays, and true multi-part stories were the exception rather than the norm. At the conclusion of each story, the guest villains of the next story would usually make an uncredited appearance in the final scene. For example, Egghead is seen riding into town, literally, at the end of "Louie the Lilac". A notable "spin" on this idea were the "linked" episodes "Ring Around the Riddler" and "The Wail of the Siren". In "Ring Around the Riddler", The Siren has an "introductory" scene assisting The Riddler in his criminal caper and briefly mentioning having her own plans for Commissioner Gordon. Batman subsequently defeats the Riddler, and the Siren returns in the tag to start her own caper, which is the basis of "The Wail of the Siren", really a separate story altogether. 

Major cast changes during Season 3 included Yvonne Craig joining as Batgirl, Frank Gorshin returning as The Riddler as a one-episode storyline meant that Gorshin's salary demands could now be met, and Eartha Kitt replacing Julie Newmar as The Catwoman, as Newmar was working on the film Mackenna's Gold. Curiously, a body double (Marilyn Watson) in the penultimate episode "The Entrancing Dr. Cassandra" returned the Catwoman to being a white woman. Meanwhile, ill-health reduced Madge Blake's role as Aunt Harriet Cooper to just two cameo appearances during Season 3; her appearances are indicated in the episode grid below.

See also
 Batman (TV series)
 Batman (1966 film)
 Return to the Batcave: The Misadventures of Adam and Burt
 Batman: Return of the Caped Crusaders
 Batman vs. Two-Face

Notes

References

External links
 

Episodes
Batman
Batman
 
Lists of DC Comics television series episodes
Batman
Batman